Salem bin Mohammed bin 'Awad bin Laden (4 January 1946 – 29 May 1988) was a Saudi Arabian investor and businessman.

Life
Considered the eldest son of Mohammed bin Laden, he was the founder of Saudi Binladin Group and a half-brother of Osama bin Laden. Bin Laden was educated at Millfield and acted as the patriarch of the bin Laden family after the 1967 death of his father. Salem managed the family's extensive investment portfolio and was in charge of family income distribution. He also oversaw the individual education plans for each of his (half-) brothers and (half-) sisters. Just like his father, he highly valued close relationship of the bin Ladens with the Saudi royal family. He provided means and support to the family during the Mecca uprising of 1979.

George W. Bush knew James Bath, a Texan businessmen who served as the North American representative for rich Saudis among Bin Laden relatives and using Bath connections he met billionaire Salem bin Laden, banker and BCCI Khalid bin Mahfouz. The two Saudis were willing to invest in the oil business. Salem Bin Laden was one of the investors in the Arbusto oil company, created by George W. Bush in 1979.

He owned a house in Orlando, Florida, and often used it for vacation stays.

Death
Salem bin Laden died on 29 May 1988, when he accidentally drifted into high-voltage electrical power lines adjacent to the Kitty Hawk Field of Dreams Ultra-Lite Flying Field at the edge of Schertz, a northeastern San Antonio suburb. The Sprint ultralight aircraft he was flying fell 115 feet to the ground after the wire strike. Salem, who was not wearing a safety helmet, died of head injuries from the resulting fall. The National Transportation Safety Board did not conduct an accident investigation since the aircraft was an ultralight aircraft, which was not covered under their mandate due to exemption while operating under FAR Part 103 Provisions required by Federal law. The Schertz Police, who attended to the incident, stated in the report that Salem died in a freak accident.

This was the second plane crash-related death in the bin Laden family, as Salem's father Mohammed bin Laden was also killed in a plane crash in 1967.

A third plane crash claimed more members of the bin Laden family on 31 July 2015 when a business jet carrying Osama bin Laden's half sister, Sana, and his stepmother, Rajaa Hashim, crashed at Blackbushe airport in Hampshire, England.

References

Salem
1946 births
1988 deaths
Accidental deaths in Texas
Aviators killed in aviation accidents or incidents in the United States
Salem
People educated at Millfield
Saudi Arabian expatriates in the United States
Victims of aviation accidents or incidents in 1988